Vitali Vasilevich Proshkin (born May 8, 1976 in Elektrostal, Soviet Union) is a Russian former professional ice hockey defender. He last played competitively in the Kontinental Hockey League (KHL) for Salavat Yulaev Ufa as the team captain.

He was selected as a reserve by Team Russia for the 2010 Winter Olympics should an injury occur during the tournament.

Career statistics

International

Awards and honours
Russian championship:  2000, 2006, 2007
European Champions Cup:  2007 (With Ak Bars Kazan)

References

External links

1976 births
Living people
People from Elektrostal
Russian ice hockey defencemen
Ak Bars Kazan players
HC Dynamo Moscow players
Kristall Elektrostal players
Salavat Yulaev Ufa players
Sportspeople from Moscow Oblast